Yuwen Qiubuqin (died  299) was a chieftain of the Yuwen tribe in the 290s. He married the daughter of the Tuoba leader Tuoba Chuo in 293, shortly after his father Yuwen Pubo became the chieftain (which followed the mutiny that killed Yuwen Pubo's brother Yuwen Mohuai). Yuwen Qiubuqin succeeded his father and was succeeded by his son Yuwen Mogui. Another son of his was Yuwen Quyun, who held important posts during Yuwen Mogui's reign.

References

299 deaths
Year of birth unknown
Chieftains of the Yuwen clan